Judge Bingham may refer to:

George Hutchins Bingham (1864–1949), judge of the United States Court of Appeals for the First Circuit
John Bingham (1815–1900), judge of the Harrison County, Ohio, Court of Common Pleas
Kinsley S. Bingham (1808–1861), judge of the probate court of Livingston County, Michigan
Robert Worth Bingham (1871–1937), judge of the circuit court of Jefferson County, Kentucky

See also
Justice Bingham (disambiguation)